The Aliw Awards by the Aliw Awards Foundation, Inc. was established by the renowned Philippine journalist Alice H. Reyes, to recognize achievements in the live entertainment industry in the Philippines. It was founded in 1975 by the National Press Club but was then managed by the Aliw Foundation.

The first awards show was held in 1977 with singer Pilita Corrales winning the Entertainer of the Year Award followed by Rico Puno and Celeste Legaspi in 1978 and 1979, respectively. In 2007, the Award was given to Regine Velasquez, who also received it in 2009 and 2019. Charice Pempengco received the 2011 Aliw Award, making her the youngest artist to be conferred such recognition.

Aliw is the root word meaning "to entertain" in Filipino.

References

Philippine music awards
1976 establishments in the Philippines

Award ceremonies in the Philippines